WWE Mixed Match Challenge, also known simply as Mixed Match Challenge, was a seasonal professional wrestling  series and tournament that was produced by WWE, where all matches are mixed tag team matches. Like all professional wrestling events, it is based on scripted storylines and its outcomes are predetermined. The 12-episode first season premiered on January 16, 2018 on Facebook Watch. Each episode was 20–25 minutes in length and featured one match. The show filled WWE's 10:00pm ET timeslot previously held by 205 Live. Following the show's premiere, 205 Live began to air at 10:20pm ET. On September 4, 2018, WWE announced a second season of Mixed Match Challenge, with the season premiering on September 18 immediately following SmackDown Live. Season 2 consisted of 13 30-minute episodes, with each featuring two matches. Episodes of season 2 aired at 10:00pm ET, with a weekly pre-show that started at 9:50pm ET.

Season 1
The teams, which were made up of both male and female wrestlers from both the Raw and SmackDown brands, were picked by their respective general managers, Kurt Angle and Daniel Bryan. Each team wrestled for the chance to give $100,000 to a charity of the winner's choice, while all other charities received $10,000 each. During the second episode, Angle and Bryan announced that the first week of Mixed Match Challenge received 35 million total engagements. The Miz and Asuka won the inaugural Mixed Match Challenge tournament, earning the $100,000 for the Rescue Dogs Rock charity. Enzo Amore was originally supposed to take part, but was replaced with Apollo Crews after catching the flu. Samoa Joe was originally Bayley's tag team partner after winning a fan vote, but was injured and replaced by Elias, who finished second in the fan vote. Alicia Fox suffered a broken tailbone and was replaced by Mandy Rose. Big E became the partner for Carmella after winning a fan vote between all three members of The New Day.

Teams

Bracket
The full tournament bracket was revealed on January 11, 2018 on WWE.com. In one of the semifinal matches, fans were able to vote on a Facebook poll, for an eliminated team to be given a second chance in the tournament.
 Daniel Bryan was the special guest referee for this match after winning a fan vote.

 This team won a Second Chance poll, earning 40% of the votes to re-enter the tournament.

 Becky Lynch replaced Charlotte Flair for this match after Flair had dental surgery.

Broadcast team

Season 2
The second season premiered on September 18, 2018 on Facebook Watch. In the second season, teams  competed in a round robin-style tournament throughout the fourteen 30-minute, two match episodes, in order to qualify for the playoffs. The final of season two took place at the TLC: Tables, Ladders & Chairs pay-per-view event on December 16, where the winning team would enter the Royal Rumble at number 30 for their respective Royal Rumble matches and an all-expense-paid trip to anywhere in the world. 

During the tournament, several wrestlers were replaced due to injuries or storyline related reasons. Alexa Bliss was originally supposed to take part in the tournament again alongside her partner, Braun Strowman, however, due to an arm injury, Ember Moon replaced Bliss. Mickie James replaced Sasha Banks as Lashley's partner. Kevin Owens was also originally partnered with Natalya, but he was replaced by Bobby Roode after a surgery in both knees. On November 13, 2018, SmackDown General Manager Paige announced that AJ Styles was not going to compete on that night's episode of Mixed Match Challenge following his controversial WWE Championship loss to Daniel Bryan on SmackDown Live, being substituted by Jeff Hardy. It was announced that Strowman was unable to compete in the Mixed Match Challenge playoffs after an elbow injury and was replaced by Curt Hawkins. On December 10, 2018, it was announced that Bálor was unable to compete in the Mixed Match Challenge semi-finals, being substituted by Apollo Crews.

Teams

Bracket

Playoffs

 R-Truth and Carmella won the final of Mixed Match Challenge Season 2, earning themselves the #30 spots in the 2019 Royal Rumble matches and an all-expenses-paid vacation, which R-Truth chose to be the WWE headquarters in Stamford, Connecticut. However, R-Truth did not participate in the men's Royal Rumble match, as he was attacked by Nia Jax (who took the #30 spot) during his entrance. As a consolation prize for having his spot stolen, he was awarded a WWE United States Championship match against new champion Shinsuke Nakamura on the January 29, 2019 episode of SmackDown, which he won becoming a two-time champion.

Broadcast team

Awards and nominations

References

External links

Television series by WWE
Facebook Watch original programming
2018 American television series debuts
English-language television shows
American non-fiction web series
WWE tournaments
WWE Network shows
Tag team tournaments
Women in WWE